John Brian Slater (20 October 1932 – 10 September 1999) was an English professional footballer who played in the Football League as an inside forward.

References

1932 births
1999 deaths
Footballers from Sheffield
English footballers
Association football forwards
Sheffield Wednesday F.C. players
Grimsby Town F.C. players
Rotherham United F.C. players
Chesterfield F.C. players
Burton Albion F.C. players
English Football League players